Vahdat Rural District may refer to:
 Vahdat Rural District (Kerman Province)
 Vahdat Rural District (Kohgiluyeh and Boyer-Ahmad Province)